Bernard Joseph Cribbins  (29 December 1928 – 27 July 2022) was an English actor and singer whose career spanned more than seven decades. 

During the 1960s, Cribbins became known in the UK for his successful novelty records "The Hole in the Ground" and "Right Said Fred" and for his appearances in comedy films including Two-Way Stretch (1960) and the Carry On series. His other screen roles include the astronaut Vincent Mountjoy in The Mouse on the Moon (1963), Albert Perks in The Railway Children (1970), the barman Felix Forsythe in Alfred Hitchcock's Frenzy (1972) and the pretentious hotel guest Mr Hutchinson in the Fawlty Towers episode "The Hotel Inspectors" (1975). On television, he was a regular and prolific reader for the BBC series Jackanory from 1966 to 1991, he narrated the children's programme The Wombles (1973–1975) and he played the title role in the CBeebies series Old Jack's Boat (2013–2015).

In the 1966 film Daleks' Invasion Earth 2150 A.D., Cribbins portrayed Tom Campbell, a companion to Dr. Who. 41 years later, he began appearing in the revival series of Doctor Who as Wilfred Mott, the grandfather of regular companion Donna Noble and a temporary companion to the Tenth Doctor.

Early life
Bernard Joseph Cribbins was born on 29 December 1928 in the Derker area of Oldham, Lancashire, the son of the cotton weaver Ethel (née Clarkson; 1898–1989) and the First World War veteran John Edward Cribbins (1896–1964). He had two sisters, alongside whom he grew up close to poverty. He described his father as a "jack of all trades" who also dabbled in acting. Cribbins left school at the age of 13 and found a job as an assistant stage manager at a local theatre club, where he also took on some small acting roles, and then served an apprenticeship at the Oldham Repertory Theatre. In 1947, he began national service with the Parachute Regiment in Aldershot, Hampshire, including a posting to Mandatory Palestine.

Career

Early career
Cribbins made his first West End theatre appearance in 1956 at the Arts Theatre, playing the two Dromios in A Comedy of Errors, and co-starred in the first West End productions of Not Now Darling, There Goes the Bride and Run for Your Wife. In 1960, he starred alongside Anna Quayle and Lionel Blair in the revue And Another Thing, written by Ted Dicks and Myles Rudge. The show brought Cribbins to the attention of Parlophone head George Martin, who signed Cribbins to the label to record a single of a satirical song from the show titled "Folk Song". Subsequently, Rudge and Dicks were subsequently asked to provide new material for Cribbins; their compositions "The Hole in the Ground", about an annoyed workman who eventually buries a harasser, and "Right Said Fred", about three workmen who struggle to move an unspecified heavy and awkward object into or out of a building (later also the name of a pop novelty band who named themselves after the song), were top ten hits on the UK Singles Chart in 1962. The third and final Cribbins single of the year "Gossip Calypso", written by Trevor Peacock, was another top 30 hit.

Films
Cribbins appeared in films from the early 1950s, mainly comedies. His credits include Two-Way Stretch (1960) and The Wrong Arm of the Law (1963) with Peter Sellers, Crooks in Cloisters (1964) and three Carry On films – Carry On Jack (1963), Carry On Spying (1964) and Carry On Columbus (1992). His other appearances include the second Doctor Who film Daleks' Invasion Earth 2150 A.D. (1966) as Special Police Constable Tom Campbell; She (1965); Casino Royale (1967) as Carlton Towers, a British Foreign Office official, The Railway Children (1970) as Mr Albert Perks, the station porter and the Alfred Hitchcock thriller Frenzy (1972) as Felix Forsythe, the Covent Garden pub landlord. His later films include Dangerous Davies – The Last Detective (1981), Blackball (2003) and Run for Your Wife (2012).

Narration and voice work
Cribbins was the narrator of the British animated children's television series The Wombles from 1973 to 1975 and also played the character of the Water Rat in a BBC radio adaptation of The Wind in the Willows. He was the celebrity storyteller in more episodes of Jackanory than any other personality, with a total of 114 appearances between 1966 and 1991. He also narrated the audio tape of the Antonia Barber book The Mousehole Cat. From 1974 to 1976, Cribbins narrated Simon in the Land of Chalk Drawings.

In the 1960s Cribbins provided the voice of the character Tufty in RoSPA road safety films. He also provided the voice of Buzby, a talking cartoon bird that was the mascot for the Post Office. He also appeared in advertisements for Hornby model trains. In 1978, he provided one of two voiceovers in the electricity safety public information film Play Safe. The other voice artist was Brian Wilde; Wilde voiced the owl and Cribbins voiced the robin. In 1981, Music for Pleasure released a Swallows and Amazons audio book on tape cassette, read by Cribbins, abridged by Edward Phillips.

Cribbins also provided the voiceover work for A Passion For Angling, starring Chris Yates and Bob James (1993). In 1996, he played Puddleglum the marshwiggle in Brian Sibley's BBC Radio adaptation of C. S. Lewis's The Silver Chair. In 2013, he played Old Bailey in the radio adaptation of Neverwhere, dramatised by Dirk Maggs and in 2015 he was among an ensemble cast in an audio production of The Jungle Book, in which he played the White Cobra.

Television

Cribbins was the star of the ITV series Cribbins (1969–70). His other TV appearances include The Avengers (1968), Fawlty Towers (1975, as the spoon salesman Mr Hutchinson who is mistaken by the character Basil Fawlty for a hotel inspector), Worzel Gummidge (1980), Shillingbury Tales (1980) and its spin-off Cuffy (1983). Besides voicing The Wombles, Cribbins was a regular on BBC children's television in the 1970s as host of performance panel game Star Turn and Star Turn Challenge.

These programmes concluded with Cribbins narrating a detective story as recurring character "Ivor Notion", with a script usually by Johnny Ball but sometimes by Myles Rudge, the co-writer of his Top 10 singles. He starred in the BBC's 1975 Christmas production Great Big Groovy Horse, a rock opera based on the story of the Trojan Horse shown on BBC2 alongside Julie Covington and Paul Jones. It was later repeated on BBC1 in 1977. He regularly appeared on BBC TV's The Good Old Days recreating songs made famous by the great stars of Music Hall.

Among his later TV appearances were Dalziel and Pascoe (1999), Last of the Summer Wine (2003), Coronation Street (2003, as Wally Bannister) and Down to Earth (2005).

Cribbins starred as Jack in the series Old Jack's Boat, set in Staithes, and broadcast on the CBeebies channel starting in 2013. The cast included Helen Lederer, Janine Duvitski and former Doctor Who companion Freema Agyeman in supporting roles. Although Agyeman and Cribbins both played companions and supporting characters during David Tennant's tenure in Doctor Who (appearing in six episodes together), Old Jack's Boat was the first time the two actors have appeared together on screen. On 9 May 2015, Cribbins gave a reading at VE Day 70: A Party to Remember in Horse Guards Parade, London which was broadcast live on BBC1.

In November 2018, it was announced that Cribbins would portray Private Godfrey in a series of re-creations of lost episodes from the BBC sitcom Dad's Army. However, Cribbins left the production in February 2019 citing "personal reasons". The role of Godfrey was later played by Timothy West.

Later stage career
Cribbins' later theatre credits include the roles of Nathan Detroit in Guys and Dolls at the National Theatre, Moonface Martin in Anything Goes with Elaine Paige at the Prince Edward Theatre, Dolittle in My Fair Lady at the Houston Opera House, Texas and Watty Watkins in George Gershwin's Lady, Be Good at the Regent's Park Open Air Theatre and on tour. He also appeared in numerous pantomimes. He appeared in the BBC CBeebies Proms (Number 11 & 13) at the Royal Albert Hall on Saturday 26 & Sunday 27 July 2014 as Old Jack.

National Life Stories conducted an interview (C1173/14) with Cribbins on his memories of Richard Negri in 2006 for its An Oral History of Theatre Design collection held by the British Library.

Doctor Who
Having played Tom Campbell, a companion to Dr. Who in the feature film Daleks' Invasion Earth 2150 A.D. (1966), Cribbins returned to Doctor Who in 2006, when a photograph of him and fellow Doctor Who alumna Lynda Baron at a wedding appeared on the BBC's tie-in website for the television episode "Tooth and Claw".

In January 2007, Cribbins had a guest role as glam rock promoter Arnold Korns in Horror of Glam Rock, a Doctor Who audiodrama by Big Finish Productions. In December 2007, he appeared as Wilfred Mott in the Christmas television special, "Voyage of the Damned"; he then appeared in a recurring capacity as the same character for the 2008 series, as the grandfather of companion Donna Noble. He became a Tenth Doctor temporary companion himself in "The End of Time", the two-part 2009–10 Christmas and New Year special, when his character was inadvertently responsible for that Doctor's demise. Cribbins's role as Wilfred Mott makes him the only actor to have played two companions and the only actor featured alongside the Doctor's enemies, the Daleks, in both the TV and cinema versions of Doctor Who. In 2019, he reprised the role of Wilfred in "No Place" a story in The Tenth Doctor Adventures produced by Big Finish. Cribbins was reported to be returning to Doctor Who alongside David Tennant and Catherine Tate for a 2023  episode celebrating the programme's 60th anniversary, which he was seen filming before his death in July 2022.

Honours
Cribbins was awarded the General Service Medal, with clasp "Palestine 1945–48", for his service in Palestine with 2/3 Battalion, the Parachute Regiment, on 30 May 1948, under Army Order 146 of 1947.

In 2009, Cribbins was honoured for his work in children's television with a Special Award at the British Academy Children's Awards which was presented by former co-star Catherine Tate, who portrayed his character's granddaughter in Doctor Who. He was appointed Officer of the Order of the British Empire (OBE) in the 2011 Birthday Honours for services to drama. He received his OBE from the Princess Royal at an investiture in the Waterloo Chamber at Windsor Castle on 3 November 2011. In 2014, he was awarded the J. M. Barrie award for his "lasting contribution to children's arts".

Cribbins was named "British Icon of the Week" on 23 December 2020 by BBC America.

Personal life and death
Cribbins and Gillian McBarnet, an assistant stage manager, were married from 1955 until her death on 11 October 2021. They lived in Weybridge, Surrey, and had no children, with Cribbins revealing in 2018 that they "lost one quite early on and that was the only time [they] got near it". He was diagnosed with prostate cancer in 2009, but said in 2018 that he was "in good health" at the age of 90 with the exception of a "nagging back condition".

In 2018 his autobiography, Bernard Who? 75 Years of Doing Just About Anything, was published by Constable. A successful social media campaign in 2022 led to his autobiography being recorded as an audiobook, with Cribbins as the narrator, but this was left uncompleted at the time of his death.

Cribbins died at the age of 93 on 27 July 2022. His funeral took place at Woking Crematorium in Woking, Surrey on 14 September.

Filmography

Film

Television

Selected audio roles

Discography

Albums

Chart singles

Explanatory notes

References

External links

 – incomplete and list of works not updated since 2005

Bernard Cribbins at The Actors Compendium

1928 births
2022 deaths
20th-century British Army personnel
20th-century English comedians
21st-century English comedians
20th-century English male actors
21st-century English male actors
20th-century English male singers
20th-century English singers
Audiobook narrators
BBC people
British novelty song performers
British Parachute Regiment soldiers
English autobiographers
English comedy musicians
English male film actors
English male radio actors
English male stage actors
English male television actors
English male voice actors
Male actors from Oldham
Officers of the Order of the British Empire
Parlophone artists
Place of death missing